Artie Diamond, out of New York City, New York, was a welterweight boxer from the 1940s–1950s.  He was featured in Inside Sports in February 1982 in a 5-page article titled "Artie Diamond:  The Toughest SOB Who Ever Lived".  He was known for never ducking a punch.  He spent time in Clinton Correctional Facility in New York for shooting a guard during a bank robbery. His first day in Clinton he beat up all the boss heads including one fight where he bit off another inmate's ear.

His boxing record was W24(16KO) and L9(4KO) and DRAW-0.  He boxed 150 rounds and finished with a 48.48 KO%.

Bouts

References

Boxers from New York (state)
Welterweight boxers
Year of birth missing
Place of birth missing
Year of death uncertain
American male boxers